The Luella Garvey House, at 589-599 California Ave. in Reno, Nevada, United States.

History
The house was designed by architect Paul Revere Williams (1894–1980), in the Colonial Revival style with French Regency architectural elements. Construction was completed in 1934.

The house was listed on the National Register of Historic Places in 2004.  It was deemed notable as "the earliest Reno commission of the noted African-American architect Paul Revere Williams", who designed more than 15 works in Nevada.

See also
National Register of Historic Places listings in Washoe County, Nevada

References 

Houses in Reno, Nevada
Houses completed in 1934
Houses on the National Register of Historic Places in Nevada
National Register of Historic Places in Reno, Nevada
Colonial Revival architecture in Nevada
Paul Williams (architect) buildings
1934 establishments in Nevada